The Macau national football team represents the Chinese special administrative region of Macau in international association football. The team is supervised by the Macau Football Association (Portuguese: Associação de Futebol de Macau). The Macau football team has a ranking that is one of the lowest among the FIFA members.  Although usually known as simply Macau, the EAFF refers to the team as Macau, China.

The national team has never qualified for the AFC Asian Cup or EAFF East Asian Championship. The team qualified for the 2006 AFC Challenge Cup, where they got one draw and two losses.

The team had been representing Macau in international football events before 1999 when Macau was a dependent territory of Portugal. It continues to represent Macau even after Macau was handed over to the People's Republic of China by Portugal and became a special administrative region of China in 1999. This team is separate from the China national football team, as the Basic Law and the principle of "one country, two systems" allows Macau to maintain its own representative teams in international sports competitions. In Macau, the Macau football team is colloquially referred to as the "Macau team", while the Chinese national team is referred to as the "national team".

FIFA suspension

In 2005 Macau was temporarily barred by FIFA from entering any international matches because of alleged undue influence of the government in forming the committee of its football association. The suspension was lifted after rectification by Macau.

Recent results and fixtures

2023

Coaching staff

Coaching history

 João dos Santos (1996–1998)
 Masataka Imai (2003–2004)
 Masanaga Kageyama (2006–2008)
 Leung Sui Wing (2008–2015)
 Tam Iao San (2015–2017)
 Chan Hiu Ming (2017–2018)
 Iong Cho Ieng (2018–2019)
 Lázaro Oliveira (2020–present)

Players

Current squad 
The following 23 players have been selected to the final squad for the 2022 FIFA World Cup qualification matches against Sri Lanka on 6 June 2019 and 11 June 2019.

Caps and goals correct as of 6 June 2019, after the match against Sri Lanka.

Recent call-ups 
The following players have also been called up to the Macau squad recently.

Records

Players in bold are still active with Macau.

Most appearances

Top goalscorers

Competitive record

FIFA World Cup

AFC Asian Cup

East Asian Cup record

AFC Challenge Cup record

AFC Solidarity Cup record

Head-to-head record

References

External links 
Macau team profile at NationalFootballTeams.com

 
Asian national association football teams